Blåbergi  is a mountain in the municipality  of Hol in Buskerud county, Norway. It is south of Fossedalen, southeast of Fossebrea and southwest of Nuten.

References

Hol
Mountains of Viken